Amazons is a 1986 Argentine-American fantasy adventure film directed by Alejandro Sessa and starring Penelope Reed, Danitza Kingsley, Joseph Whipp, Ty Randolph, and Jacques Arndt. The screenplay was written by Charles R. Saunders, based on his short story Agbewe’s Sword, which first appeared in the 1979 anthology Amazons! The short story is included as part of the series Dossouye, about the real-life female warriors of the West African Kingdom of Dahomey, gathered together in a novel published by Saunders in 2008.

Plot
Amazons is an epic story that follows a legendary tribe of warrior women from a mythical time.

Cast
 Mindi Miller ... Dyala (as Windsor Taylor Randolph)
 Penelope Reed ... Tashi 
 Joseph Whipp ... Kalungo 
 Danitza Kingsley ... Tashinge 
 Wolfram Hecht ... Matlin (as Wolfram Hoechst) 
  ... High Priest
 Charles Finch ... Timar 
 Francisco Cocuzza ... Baliguri (as Frank Cocza) 
 Santiago Mallo ... Halfhead 
 Anita Larronde ... Emerald Queen (as Annie Larronde) 
 Armando Capo ... Hitron (as Armand Capó) 
 Maria Fournery ... Vishiti (as Mary Fournery) 
 Nöelle Balfour ... Lati 
 Esther Velázquez ... Azundati 
 Marcos Woinsky ... Artan (as Marc Woinsky) 
 Fabiana Smith ... Lioness (Akam) 
 William Reta ... Guard 
 Lena Marie Johansson ... Female Noble #1 
 Linda Guzmán ... Female Noble #2

References

External links
 
 

1986 films
1980s fantasy adventure films
American fantasy adventure films
Films produced by Roger Corman
High fantasy films
American sword and sorcery films
1980s Spanish-language films
Films about witchcraft
Argentine fantasy adventure films
English-language Argentine films
1980s English-language films
1980s American films
1980s Argentine films